Homicide: Life on the Street is an American police drama television series chronicling the work of a fictional version of the Baltimore Police Department's Homicide Unit. It ran for seven seasons (122 episodes) on NBC from January 31, 1993, to May 21, 1999, and was succeeded by Homicide: The Movie (2000), which served as the series finale. The series was created by Paul Attanasio and based on David Simon's book Homicide: A Year on the Killing Streets (1991). Many of the characters and stories used throughout the show were based on events depicted in the book.

While Homicide featured an ensemble cast, Andre Braugher emerged as a breakout star through his portrayal of Detective Frank Pembleton. The show won Television Critics Association Awards for Outstanding Achievement in Drama in 1996, 1997, and 1998. It also became the first drama ever to win three Peabody Awards for drama in 1993, 1995, and 1997. It received recognition from the Primetime Emmy Awards, Satellite Awards, Image Awards, Viewers for Quality Television, GLAAD Media Awards and Young Artist Awards. In 1997, the fifth season episode "Prison Riot" was ranked No. 32 on TV Guide's 100 Greatest Episodes of All Time.

In 2007, it was listed as one of TIME magazine's "Best TV Shows of All-TIME." In 1996, TV Guide named the series 'The Best Show You're Not Watching'. The show placed #46 on Entertainment Weekly "New TV Classics" list. In 2013, TV Guide ranked it #55 on its list of the 60 Best Series of All Time.

Characters

Overview 
Homicide: Life on the Street was adapted from Homicide: A Year on the Killing Streets, a non-fiction book by Baltimore Sun reporter David Simon, based on his experience following a Baltimore Police Department homicide unit for all of 1988. Simon, who became a consultant and producer with the series, said he was particularly interested in the demythification of the American detective. While detectives are typically portrayed as noble characters who care deeply about their victims, Simon believed real detectives regarded violence as a normal aspect of their jobs.

Simon sent the book to film director and Baltimore native Barry Levinson with the hopes that it would be adapted into a film, but Levinson thought it would be more appropriate material for television because the stories and characters could be developed over a longer period of time. Levinson believed that a television adaptation would bring a fresh and original edge to the police drama genre because the book exploded many of the myths of the police drama genre by highlighting that cops did not always get along with each other, and that criminals occasionally got away with their crimes.

Levinson approached screenwriter Paul Attanasio with the material, and Homicide became Attanasio's first foray into television writing. Subsequently, all episodes of Homicide display the credit, "Created by Paul Attanasio" at the end of their opening sequence, a credit which both Eric Overmyer and James Yoshimura dispute on the DVD audio commentary to the season 5 episode, "The Documentary", claiming instead the show was created by Tom Fontana and Yoshimura. The series title was originally Homicide: A Year on the Killing Streets, but NBC changed it so that viewers would not believe it was limited to a single year; the network also believed the use of the term "life" would be more reaffirming than the term "killing streets". Levinson was indifferent to the change, asserting that viewers would probably casually refer to the series as "Homicide" in either case. The opening theme music was composed by Baltimore native Lynn F. Kowal, a graduate of the Peabody Institute of the Johns Hopkins University in Baltimore.

Homicide'''s purpose was to provide its viewers with a no-nonsense, police procedural-type glimpse into the lives of a squad of inner-city detectives. As opposed to many television shows and movies involving cops, Homicide initially opted for a bleak sort of realism in its depiction of "The Job", portraying it as repetitive, spiritually draining, an existential threat to one's psyche, often glamour- and glory-free—but, nonetheless, a social necessity. In its attempt to do so, Homicide developed a trademark feel and look that distinguished itself from its contemporaries. For example, the series was filmed with hand-held 16 mm cameras almost entirely on-location in Baltimore (making the idiosyncratic city something of a character itself). It also regularly used music montages, jump cut editing, and the three-times-in-a-row repetition of the same camera shot during particularly crucial moments in the story. The episodes were also noted for interweaving as many as three or four storylines in a single episode. NBC executives often asked the writers to focus on a single homicide case rather than multiple ones, but the show producers tended to resist this advice.

Despite premiering in the coveted post-Super Bowl time slot, the show opened to lackluster ratings, and cancellation was an immediate threat. However, the show's winning of two Emmy Awards (for Levinson's direction of "Gone for Goode" and Fontana's writing of "Three Men and Adena") and the success of another police drama—the more sensational NYPD Blue—helped convince NBC to give it another chance beyond the truncated, nine-episode-long first season. Homicide consistently ranked behind ABC's 20/20 and CBS's Nash Bridges in the Nielsen ratings. Despite the poor ratings, reviews were consistently strong from the beginning of the series. Commentators were especially impressed with the high number of strong, complex, well-developed and non-stereotypical African American characters like Pembleton, Lewis and Giardello.

The police department scenes were shot at the historic City Recreation Pier in the Fells Point neighborhood in Baltimore. Although NBC occasionally pressured the show's producers to write happy endings to the homicide cases, the network gave an unusual amount of freedom for the writers to create darker stories and non-traditional detective story elements, like unsolved cases where criminals escape. Nevertheless, in its attempt to improve Homicides ratings, NBC often insisted on changes, both cosmetic and thematic. For example, by the beginning of the third season, talented but unphotogenic veteran actor Jon Polito had been ordered dropped from the cast.

Considered by critics to be one of television's most authentic police dramas, as well as an excellent dramatic series propelled by a talented ensemble cast, Homicide garnered three straight TCA (Television Critics Association) Awards for Outstanding Achievement in Drama from 1996 to 1998 and was the first drama ever to win three of the prestigious Peabody Awards for best drama (1993, 1995, 1997).

The show was originally a production of Baltimore Pictures in association with Thames Television's subsidiary studio Reeves Entertainment, an American studio. Inbetween the first and second season, Reeves had closed due to Pearson plc's acquisition of their parent company Thames, and the latter's requirement of either spinning off the studio or transferring their existing properties still in production which included Home in late 1993. After the four-episode second season had aired, NBC negotiated with Thames and MCEG Sterling Entertainment, who oversaw and held interest on the Homicide property on behalf of Thames, on the show's renewal for an order for a third season alongside taking over co-ownership, co-production duties, and copyright, though Pearson (whose television division and library is now owned by Fremantle) continued to hold international distribution rights outside of North America.

The reality of Homicides low Nielsen ratings hovered over all things, however, and always left the show in a precarious position; it also had a harder time gaining a large audience because fewer viewers are at home watching TV on Friday nights. Despite this, the network managed to keep what TV Guide referred to as "The Best Show You're Not Watching" on the air for five full seasons and seven seasons in all. In July 1997, NBC gave the series producers an ultimatum to make Homicide more popular than Nash Bridges or face cancellation. When this goal was not reached, the studio gave serious consideration to canceling the show, but a number of shocks at NBC increased Homicide's value. Among those factors were the loss of the popular series Seinfeld and the $850 million deal needed to keep ER from leaving the network.

Homicide was at one time syndicated on Lifetime and Court TV as well as the all-crime television cable station Sleuth, and aired on WGN America. Episodes of Homicide have aired on TNT as part of several crossovers the series had with Law & Order, which TNT owns broadcast rights for; in these cases both crossover episodes aired back to back. It was recently televised on the Centric channel.

All seven seasons are available on DVD. One DVD set combines the first two seasons. Additional sets contain the complete third, fourth, fifth, sixth, and seventh seasons. A boxed set shaped like a filing cabinet features an additional disc containing the Homicide TV movie and the relevant Law & Order crossover episodes – those without this disc had to rely on Law & Order recap clips on the season DVDs. Significantly, the DVDs contain the episodes in the producers' intended order, not the order in which NBC aired them.

The show has spawned changes in the real life Baltimore homicide unit. As seen in the show, the unit originally used a dry-erase board in order to visually track detectives' progress at solving crimes. After the show began to air, the Baltimore Police Department discontinued the practice, believing the board, which concentrated on "clearance rates" for crimes, had a negative impact on publicity. It was brought back later at the insistence of the detectives.

 Broadcast history 

 Plot 

 Seasons 1 and 2 

The first season saw the introductions of Detectives Frank Pembleton (Andre Braugher), Stan Bolander (Ned Beatty), Kay Howard (Melissa Leo), Meldrick Lewis (Clark Johnson), John Munch (Richard Belzer), Tim Bayliss (Kyle Secor), Beau Felton (Daniel Baldwin) and Steve Crosetti (Jon Polito), as well as the Commander, Lieutenant Al Giardello (Yaphet Kotto).

 Season 3 

The third season saw the first changes in the character lineup; when Detective Steve Crosetti (Jon Polito) was not seen in any episodes, his body was found in a death by suicide in the sixth episode of the season. Isabella Hofmann joined the cast as Lieutenant Megan Russert, the commander of the other Homicide shift, it also dealt with her promotion to Captain, and saw the last appearances of Felton and Bolander (Daniel Baldwin, Ned Beatty).

 Seasons 4 and 5 

The fourth season saw the departure of Daniel Baldwin and Ned Beatty, who played Beau Felton and Stan Bolander respectively. In the story, the two detectives had recently been given a 22 week suspension, as related in the opening scene of the season's first episode. Bolander went on to retirement, and Felton, recruited for deep undercover work, was killed (off-screen) in the line of duty during the fifth season. The characters returned in the movie.
This season also sees Mike Kellerman (Reed Diamond) join the cast. Isabella Hofmann (newly demoted, Detective Megan Russert) left at the end of Season 4, but returned in the Season 5 finale, in which she, Kay Howard (Melissa Leo) and J.H. Brodie (Max Perlich) made their last appearances.
Season 5 also saw the addition of Chief Medical Examiner Julianna Cox (Michelle Forbes) and Detective Terri Stivers (Toni Lewis).

 Season 6 

The sixth season was the first not to feature Leo as Sergeant Kay Howard, and the last to feature Braugher as Detective Frank Pembleton and Forbes as Chief Medical Examiner Julianna Cox. Jon Seda, Callie Thorne and Peter Gerety joined the cast as Detectives Paul Falsone, Laura Ballard and Stuart Gharty. J.H. Brodie (Max Perlich) is no longer present, nor is Detective Meg Russert (Isabella Hofmann).

 Season 7 

Following the events of the sixth season finale, Detective Frank Pembleton (Braugher) and Detective Mike Kellerman (Diamond) are no longer regulars; neither is Chief Medical Examiner Julianna Cox (Forbes), who left mid-season. Braugher and Forbes did not return until the movie, while Diamond made a two-episode guest appearance. Michael Michele stars in this season as Det. Rene Sheppard and Giancarlo Esposito is cast as Giardello's son Mike, who is assigned to Homicide as an FBI Liaison.

 Homicide: The Movie 

In 2000, following the conclusion of the series, a TV film titled Homicide: The Movie was shown on NBC. The squad's former Lieutenant, Al Giardello, was running for mayor on a controversial pro-drug-legalization platform, and is close to victory when he is gunned down. The assassination attempt inspires the return of the entire unit, past and present, in an effort to apprehend the gunman.

 Crossovers 
Homicide: Life on the Street executive producer Tom Fontana and Law & Order creator Dick Wolf became close friends in the 1980s while working as writers in the same building, at the same time, on the series St. Elsewhere (Fontana) and Hill Street Blues (Wolf).

In the 1990s, the two friends decided to do a small crossover between their (then) current shows, with Law & Order NYPD Detective Mike Logan (Chris Noth) delivering a fugitive to Homicide: Life on the Streets BPD Detective Frank Pembleton during the prologue of the season 3 episode "Law & Disorder".

The concept proved popular with fans and with both Fontana and Wolf. As of the 2015–2016 television season, this first crossover by Wolf has been followed by 15 other crossover stories in his numerous Law & Order and Chicago franchises. Fontana expanded the Homicide: Life on the Street crossovers to include characters from St. Elsewhere, years after that series had ended its run.  Wolf would adopt the same post-cancellation crossover concept when Homicide: Life on the Street characters Meldrick Lewis and Billie Lou Hatfield (Ellen McElduff) appeared, 14 years after their series ended, at John Munch's retirement party from the NYPD on the Law & Order: Special Victims Unit episode "Wonderland Story".

 Other cast members 
 Recurring cast members 
Homicide featured a number of recurring characters, who starred alongside the ensemble. Wendy Hughes (Carol Blythe), Ami Brabson (Mary Pembleton) and Željko Ivanek (Ed Danvers) are the most notable, with the first appearing in Season 1, and the other two appearing in Seasons 1–6 and Seasons 1–7 respectively. Clayton LeBouef played Captain and later Colonel George Barnfather throughout the run. Ralph Tabakin played Dr. Scheiner in all seven seasons. The recurring cast also included: Gerald F. Gough as Col. Burt Granger (seasons 1–3); Lee Tergesen as Officer Chris Thormann (seasons 1, 3 and 5); Sean Whitesell as Dr. Eli Devilbiss (seasons 1, 3, 4, 6 and 7); Michael Willis as Darin Russom (seasons 1–7); Sharon Ziman as Naomi (seasons 1–7); Judy Thornton as Judy (seasons 2–7); Herb Levinson as Dr. Lausanne (seasons 2–7); Gary D'Addario as Lt. Jasper (seasons 3–7); Walt MacPherson as Capt. Roger Gaffney (seasons 3–7); Harlee McBride as Alyssa Dyer (seasons 3–7); Rhonda Overby as Reporter Dawn Daniels (seasons 3–7); Kristin Rohde as Officer Sally Rogers (seasons 3–7); Mary B. Ward as Beth Felton (season 3); Christopher Meloni as bounty hunter Dennis Knoll (season 7); Erik Dellums as Luther Mahoney (seasons 4 and 5); Mekhi Phifer as Junior Bunk (seasons 5 and 6); Hazelle Goodman as Georgia Rae Mahoney (season 6); Ellen McElduff as Billie Lou Hatfield (seasons 5–7); Austin Pendleton as Dr. George Griscom (season 7), and Jason Stanford as Joe Ryblack (seasons 6 and 7). Joey Perillo as Bernard Munch (Seasons 3 and 6).

 Notable guest appearances 
A number of well-known actors and celebrities appeared on the show, including Steve Allen, Lewis Black, Wilford Brimley, Steve Burns, Steve Buscemi, Bruce Campbell, Joan Chen, Vincent D'Onofrio, Jeffrey Donovan, Tate Donovan, Charles Durning, Charles S. Dutton, Richard Edson, Kathryn Erbe, Edie Falco, Peter Gallagher, Paul Giamatti, John Glover, Moses Gunn, Luis Guzmán, Jake Gyllenhaal, Marcia Gay Harden, Neil Patrick Harris, Pat Hingle, James Earl Jones, Terry Kinney, Bruno Kirby, Tony LoBianco, Julianna Margulies, Jena Malone, Anne Meara, Christopher Meloni, David Morse, Terry O'Quinn, Joe Perry, Chris Rock, J. K. Simmons, Fisher Stevens, Jerry Stiller (in a different season from wife Anne Meara), Eric Stoltz, Tony Todd, Lily Tomlin, Kate Walsh, Isaiah Washington, John Waters, Robin Williams, Dean Winters, Elijah Wood, and Alfre Woodard. Jason Priestley joined the cast in the climactic television movie, during which his character referred to Pembleton and Bayliss as "legends". Typically, well-known actors making guest appearances on Homicide were cast in fully developed roles central to the episode in which they appeared. Robin Williams's portrayal of a grieving widower and father in the second-season, "Bop Gun", is a notable example, as is Steve Buscemi's role as a suspected gunman in the third-season "End Game."

Some celebrities made cameo appearances that were more lighthearted in style. Director (and Baltimore native) John Waters—who called the show "the grittiest, best-acted, coolest-looking show on TV"—appeared twice, once as a nameless bartender listening to a disconsolate Detective Bolander, and another time as a talkative prisoner transferred from New York to Baltimore by Det. Mike Logan (played by Chris Noth). Waters and Noth received "special thanks" in the episode's closing credits. Out traveling on his motorcycle, Jay Leno stopped in at the Waterfront to have a soft drink, quickly departing after finding his bartenders strangely silent. In one particularly self-referential episode, journalist Tim Russert appeared as himself, bickering about birthday presents with his "cousin", Lieutenant Megan Russert. Film director Barry Levinson, who also executive produced Homicide, acted as himself directing an episode for a show-within-a-show called Homicide in the episode, "The Documentary".

Psychobilly legend The Reverend Horton Heat made a brief appearance as Preacher Lemuel Galvin, a resident at a motel where the killing of a biker is investigated.

The Mayor of Baltimore (Kurt Schmoke) and the Governor of Maryland (Parris Glendening) made brief appearances in the episode about the death of Beau Felton, appearing at the memorial press conference for Felton's death in the line of duty.

Recurring characters of particular note include the Mahoney crime family. Luther Mahoney, played by Erik Dellums, appears in seasons four and five. Mahoney is a crime and drug kingpin who uses others to do his dirty work and masterfully manipulates the law to repeatedly escape conviction and hide his connection to the crimes committed by his underlings. At first, he is depicted as an almost friendly rival, with both Mahoney and the police mutually amused by Mahoney's antics. Gradually, however, the police—particularly Kellerman and Lewis—grow frustrated with Mahoney, until Lewis viciously beats him during an arrest, and Kellerman fatally shoots Mahoney under questionable circumstances.

In the following season, the Mahoney organization is taken over by Luther's sister Georgia Rae, played by Hazelle Goodman, who seeks both legal and illegal revenge against the Baltimore Police Department.

Mekhi Phifer makes several appearances as Junior Bunk, a dim-witted street thug who is initially depicted as someone with the potential to go straight. His crimes grow increasingly violent, however, and in his final appearance he is revealed to be Georgia Rae's son, with the real name "Nathaniel Lee Mahoney". Junior's final appearance takes place after the character has been hardened by jail time, and the once minor criminal deals the homicide department a major blow with a multiple shooting in the police station, killing three uniformed cops and injuring two of the detectives. In retaliation, the police declare all-out war on the Mahoney crime organization. Several cops, including Bayliss, are injured, and several criminals, including Georgia Rae, are killed as a result; in addition, both Pembleton and Kellerman turn in their badges.

 Episodes 

Home media
A&E Home Video (under license by NBC Entertainment) released all seven seasons of Homicide: Life on the Street on DVD in Region 1 between 2003 and 2005. The TV movie Homicide: The Movie was released on DVD in Region 1 by Trimark Pictures on May 22, 2001. A&E Home Entertainment also released a complete series set in collectible 'file cabinet' packaging on November 14, 2006.  The complete series was subsequently re-released in regular packaging on October 20, 2009.  FremantleMedia Ltd handled distribution rights of all 7 seasons via international.

On April 5, 2017, it was announced that Shout! Factory had acquired the rights to the series in Region 1 and would re-release Homicide: Life on the Street - The Complete Series on DVD on July 4, 2017.

In Australia, Region 4, the releases were the same as the Region 2 release. These were distributed by Roadshow Entertainment. The Complete Series collection was distributed by Shock Entertainment and packaged as the Region 1 releases with Series 1 & 2 and Series 3 through to 7. Via Vision Entertainment obtained the rights to the series and released 'The Complete Series (Special Edition)' boxset in May 2021 in the same format of the shock releases.

 Spin-off series 
The show inspired the spin-off Homicide: Second Shift'', which was shown exclusively online and did not include the regular cast.

Nielsen ratings 
 Season 1: #99—8,789,000
 Season 2: #24—12,717,000
 Season 3: #89—7,822,800
 Season 4: #66—8,535,100
 Season 5: #68—7,760,000
 Season 6: #77—7,546,000
 Season 7: #66—10,238,200

Awards and nominations

References

Bibliography

External links 

 
 
 
 Homicide: Links on the Sites – News links, web sites, merchandise

 
1990s American mystery television series
1990s American police procedural television series
1990s American crime drama television series
1993 American television series debuts
1999 American television series endings
Fictional portrayals of the Baltimore Police Department
NBC original programming
Television series by Universal Television
Peabody Award-winning television programs
Primetime Emmy Award-winning television series
Television shows set in Baltimore
Television shows based on non-fiction books
Television series based on actual events
Television series created by Paul Attanasio
English-language television shows
Works by David Simon
American detective television series